Grosscup Road Historic District is a national historic district located at Charleston, West Virginia.  The district is a neighborhood of 22, 19th and early 20th century residences.  They are architecturally and historically significant residences that were, and remain today, the residences of Charleston's prominent industrial, commercial, and political families.

It was listed on the National Register of Historic Places in 1984 as part of the South Hills Multiple Resource Area.

References

Bungalow architecture in West Virginia
Houses in Charleston, West Virginia
Colonial Revival architecture in West Virginia
Historic districts in Charleston, West Virginia
Houses on the National Register of Historic Places in West Virginia
National Register of Historic Places in Charleston, West Virginia
Victorian architecture in West Virginia
Historic districts on the National Register of Historic Places in West Virginia